OpenTracker is the open-source version of the Tracker file manager for BeOS-compatible operating systems.

Be Inc. developed the original Tracker for their operating system, BeOS. In 2000, prior to selling all of their assets to Palm, Inc., Be Inc. open-sourced some of their software, including Tracker. The software license, called the Open Tracker License , is an MIT License with two addenda restricting the use of Be Inc. trademarks.

Be Inc. hosted OpenTracker until 2001. Before the dissolution of the corporation, both Be developers and outside volunteers contributed to Be's open-source software projects. With Be's dissolution imminent, prominent OpenTracker contributor Axel Dörfler oversaw the relocation of the OpenTracker project to SourceForge, and at the same time began a new software versioning scheme. Dörfler established the new software version at 5.1.0.

Some open-source software developers continued to develop OpenTracker, while others forked the source code into novel variations. One such divergence, Tracker.NewFS, has distinctive source code for file system operations, as well as support for SVG icons. yellowTAB, too, added support for SVG icons in their closed-source fork.

See also
 Comparison of file managers
 Taskbar
 Haiku Tracker

References

External links 
 
 Tracker.NewFS, a derivative of OpenTracker

BeOS software
Free file managers
Free software programmed in C++
Software using the MIT license